Fort Duquesne was a fort established by the French in what in now Pittsburgh, Pennsylvania, in 1754 and destroyed in 1758.

Fort Duquesne may also refer to:
Battle of Fort Duquesne (1758), an unsuccessful British assault on the fort in the French and Indian Wars
Fort Duquesne Bridge, spanning the Allegheny River in Pittsburgh
RFA Fort Duquesne (A229), an air stores ship of the British Royal Fleet Auxiliary
USS Cowanesque (AO-79), a US Navy fleet oiler of World War II originally launched as the SS Fort Duquesne
Fort Duquesne (Minnesota), a former French fur trade post listed on the National Register of Historic Places

See also
Fort Duchesne, Utah